Indian Nations National Scenic and Wildlife Area is a federally designated National Scenic Area within Ouachita National Forest  south of Heavener, in Le Flore County, Oklahoma USA. The  scenic area is administered by the U.S. Forest Service. The scenic area includes the Homer L. Johnson Wildlife Management Area. There is also a  fishing lake atop Post Mountain, developed by the U. S. Forest Service during the 1930s, is included within the scenic area.

The National Scenic Area was established by Public Law 100-499, known as the "Winding Stair Mountain National Recreation Area and Wilderness Area Act", designating the area as the Indian Nations National Scenic and Wildlife Area in 1988,

Cedar Lake

It is a recreational lake, primarily used for fishing, although swimming and boating are also allowed and are popular. The main fish species are channel catfish, crappie, largemouth bass, spotted bass and sunfish. Facilities include boat docks and ramps, drinking water, outdoor grills, pavilion, picnic area with tables, playground, hook-up sites for recreational vehicles and tent sites for camping.

Notes

See also
 Winding Stair Mountain National Recreation Area
 Cedar Lake (Le Flore County, Oklahoma)

References

External links
 Indian Nations National Wildlife and Scenic Area at Ouachita National Forest

Ouachita National Forest
National scenic areas
Protected areas of Le Flore County, Oklahoma
Protected areas established in 1988
1988 establishments in Oklahoma